The men's decathlon event at the 1978 Commonwealth Games was held on 7 and 8 August at the Commonwealth Stadium in Edmonton, Alberta, Canada.

Results
Wind for 100m: Heat 1: +1.6 m/s, Heat 2: +2.3 m/s

References

Final results (The Sydney Morning Herald)
Final results (The Canberra Times)
Australian results

Athletics at the 1978 Commonwealth Games
1982